Lukovištia is a village and municipality in the Rimavská Sobota District of the Banská Bystrica Region of southern Slovakia. The village is the birthplace of Slovak writer Ivan Krasko. The house where he was born in is now a small museum. In Lukovištia there is a baroque church with a painted ceiling from 1794.

Notable personalities
Ivan Krasko, poet
Ladislav Mňačko, writer

References

External links
 
 

Villages and municipalities in Rimavská Sobota District